Enderby Land is a projecting landmass of Antarctica. It was first documented in western and eastern literature in February 1831 by John Biscoe aboard the whaling brig Tula, and named after the Enderby Brothers of London, the ship's owners who encouraged their captains to combine exploration with sealing.

Nation state claims
Subject to the constraints of the Antarctic Treaty System, the longest-held nation-state claimant rights in the territory is Australia, being a large part of its claimed Australian Antarctic Territory up to various high latitudes towards the South Pole.

Features
Coastal features include Amundsen Bay, Casey Bay and Cape Monakov. Mountain ranges or sub-ranges being crests above pack ice (escarpments), are the Scott Mountains, the Tula Mountains, and the Napier Mountains. The highest peak is Mount Elkins at  Above Ordnance Datum (conventional sea level).

See also
 Geology of Enderby Land
 Mawson Station
 History of Antarctica
 List of Antarctic expeditions

References

External links

 Australian Antarctic Gazetteer
 United States Geological Survey, Geographic Names Information System (GNIS)
 Scientific Committee on Antarctic Research (SCAR)
 PDF Map of the Australian Antarctic Territory

 
Australian Antarctic Territory
Lands of Antarctica